Come Live with Me is a 1941 American romantic comedy film produced and directed by Clarence Brown and starring James Stewart and Hedy Lamarr. Based on a story by Virginia Van Upp, the film is about a beautiful Viennese refugee seeking United States citizenship who arranges a marriage of convenience with a struggling writer.

The film's title derives from the opening line of Christopher Marlowe's poem "The Passionate Shepherd to His Love" ("Come live with me and be my love").

Plot
Johnny Jones (Lamarr), a native of Vienna, Austria who escaped after its annexation by Nazi Germany, is having an affair with the married Barton Kendrick (Ian Hunter), a publisher. One night an officer from the Department of Immigration finds her and tells her that she will be deported because her temporary passport expired three months ago. The investigator tells her that if she can be married within a week, she can stay.

Bill Smith (Stewart), a down-on-his-luck writer, runs into Jones in a diner during a rainstorm. She explains to him that she needs to marry an American citizen within a week and since he is broke, she could pay him and they would both get what they need. She pays him $17.80 a week in exchange for marrying her. Two months later, Smith is writing a book about the odd circumstances of his marriage and becomes curious about Jones, considering he only sees her once a week when she gives him a check.

Meanwhile, Jones is continuing her affair with Kendrick, but refuses to tell him how she has remained in the country. He tells Jones that he is leaving his wife and wants to marry Jones within two months. She tells Bill she wants a divorce right away, which he reluctantly agrees to. Smith finishes his book and sends it to Kendrick's publishing company, where Kendrick's wife Diane (Verree Teasdale) explains the book to Kendrick and he realizes that Smith is Jones' husband. Kendrick's chooses to publish the book and gives Smith $500 up front. After seeing Kendrick's reaction to the book, his wife realizes that he has been having an affair and that the book is real. Mrs. Kendrick decides to divorce him, but wants to make sure that Jones is actually in love with her husband first.

Meanwhile, Smith buys a new car and coerces Jones to go on a trip with him before he will sign the divorce papers. She ends up falling in love with Bill while on vacation, after meeting his family. Kendrick comes to Smith's grandmother's house in the middle of the night and Jones is forced to make the decision about who she wants, and she picks Bill.

Cast

 James Stewart as Bill Smith
 Hedy Lamarr as Johnny Smith
 Ian Hunter as Barton Kendrick
 Verree Teasdale as Diana Kendrick
 Donald Meek as Joe Darsie
 Barton MacLane as Barney Grogan
 Edward Ashley as Arnold Stafford
 Ann Codee as Yvonne
 King Baggot as Doorman
 Adeline De Walt Reynolds as Bill's Grandma
 Frank Orth as Jerry
 Frank Faylen as Waiter
 Horace McMahon as Taxi Driver
 Greta Meyer as Frieda
 Fritz Feld as Mac the Headwaiter (uncredited)
 Tom Fadden as Charlie Gephardt-Grandma's Hired Hand (uncredited)

Production

Soundtrack
 "Die Schönbrunner" Op. 200 (Joseph Lanner)
 "Come Live with Me" (John Liptrot Hatton, Christopher Marlowe)
 "William Tell Overture" (Gioachino Rossini)
 "Oh Johnny, Oh Johnny Oh!" (A. Olman, Ed Rose)
 "There is a Tavern in the Town" (F.J. Adams)
 "Long, Long Ago (1883)" (Thomas Haynes Bayly)

References

External links
 
 
 Come Live with Me at the TCM Movie Database

 

1941 films
1941 romantic comedy films
American black-and-white films
American romantic comedy films
Films about immigration to the United States
Films about writers
Films directed by Clarence Brown
Films scored by Herbert Stothart
Films set in New York City
Metro-Goldwyn-Mayer films
1940s English-language films
1940s American films